"The Wheel of Hurt" is the title of a popular song from 1966 (see 1966 in music). The song was written by Charles Singleton and Eddie Snyder.

Two versions of "The Wheel of Hurt" were released in late 1966 at virtually the same time. One version was sung by Italian American singer Al Martino, and this was a modest hit, peaking at #59 on the Billboard Hot 100 chart and at #12 on the Billboard Easy Listening chart in late 1966.

The second version of "The Wheel of Hurt" was by the American performer Margaret Whiting, a noted singer who had over 40 charting hit singles in the U.S. between 1946 and 1954. Released from her album of the same name, "The Wheel of Hurt" was Whiting's attempt at a comeback; in an interview with Billboard magazine from 1966, Whiting told Claude Hall that she "wanted to have a hit record again. Bobby Darin and Frank Sinatra proved it could be done." "The Wheel of Hurt" was Whiting's final song to hit the Top 40 on the Hot 100 chart, where it peaked at #26. The song also spent four weeks at #1 on the Easy Listening chart in November 1966.

Other artists have recorded "The Wheel of Hurt", including country music singer Eddy Arnold.

See also
List of number-one adult contemporary singles of 1966 (U.S.)

References

1966 singles
Margaret Whiting songs
Eddy Arnold songs
Songs written by Eddie Snyder
Songs written by Charles Singleton (songwriter)
1966 songs
London Records singles